Malthonea albomaculata is a species of beetle in the family Cerambycidae. It was described by Breuning in 1966. It is known from Bolivia.

References

Desmiphorini
Beetles described in 1966